Jennifer Christine Nash is the Jean Fox O'Barr Professor of Gender, Sexuality, and Feminist Studies at Duke University within its Trinity College of Arts and Sciences. Her research interests include Black feminist theory, feminist legal theory, Black sexual politics, black motherhood, black maternal health, race and law, and intersectionality,

Education
Nash earned her PhD in African American Studies at Harvard University, her JD at Harvard Law School, and an AB in women's studies at Harvard College.

Career
Nash is critical of approaches to intersectionality that demand either uncritical, unqualified support or outright rejection, calling instead for a critical engagement with the discursive formations produced under the heading of intersectionality. In particular, Nash has identified and problematized an emerging posture of territoriality and defensiveness characterizing some intersectionality discourses. This territorial posture objects to a critical regime created by and for Black women being "appropriated" for the struggles of other marginalized groups. Professor Nash sees this posture as a reiteration of a regime of territoriality, which threatens to make intersectionality into property to be defended and guarded despite black feminism's longstanding anticaptivity orientation, and the tradition's deep critiques of how logics of property enshrine boundaries and ensure that value is communicated exclusively through ownership.

Selected publications
 Birthing Black Mothers. Duke University Press, 2021.
 Black Feminism Reimagined After Intersectionality. Duke University Press, 2018.
 The Black Body in Ecstasy: Reading Race, Reading Pornography. Duke University Press, 2014.

Edited publications 
 Gender: Love. Macmillan Reference, 2016.
 The Routledge Companion to Intersectionalities. Routledge, 2023. Co-editor with Samantha Pinto
 Black Feminism on the Edge. Duke University Press, 2023. Co-editor with Samantha Pinto.

Awards

 Alan Bray Memorial Book Prize. Awarded to The Black Body in Ecstasy: Reading Race, Reading Pornography by the GL/Q Caucus in the Modern Language Association. 
 Gloria Anzaldúa Book Prize. Awarded to Black Feminism Reimagined After Intersectionality by the National Women's Studies Association. 
 Honorable mention for Gloria Anzaldúa Book Prize. Awarded to Birthing Black Mothers by the National Women's Studies Association.

References

External links

 Faculty profile at duke.edu

Living people
Duke University faculty
Harvard University alumni
African-American feminists
African-American academics
Year of birth missing (living people)
21st-century African-American people